Livio Meier (born 10 January 1998) is a Liechtensteiner footballer who currently plays for USV Eschen/Mauren.

International career
He is a member of the Liechtenstein national football team, making his debut in a friendly match against Qatar on 14 December 2017. Meier also made 17 appearances for the Liechtenstein U21 between 2015 and 2020.

International goals 
Scores and results list Liechtenstein's goal tally first.

References

1998 births
Living people
Liechtenstein footballers
Association football midfielders
FC Balzers players
USV Eschen/Mauren players
Liechtenstein international footballers
Place of birth missing (living people)